Angola first competed at the Summer Paralympic Games in 1996, and has competed in every edition of the Summer Paralympics since then. The country has never participated in the Winter Paralympic Games.

All Angolan Paralympians have competed in track and field.

Angola's first Paralympic medals came in 2004, when Jose Armando Sayovo took three gold medals in the men's 100m, 200m and 400m sprints in the T11 disability category. Armando competed again at the 2008 Summer Paralympics, and won his country's only medals of the Games - three silvers.

Angola will be taking part in the 2012 Summer Paralympics, and the Comite Paralimpico Angolano have chosen Bedford as the UK base for its Paralympians.

Medals

Medals by Summer Games

Medals by Summer Sport

List of medalists

References